Helen Riviere Haywood (December 28, 1907-1995) was an English artist and writer, known for her illustrations of children's books and her fore-edge and binding paintings. She was the daughter of Mabel Riviere Calklin (b.1875) and her father was Arthur Haywood. She was the great-granddaughter of the noted British binder, Robert Riviere (d.1882).

Early life 
Haywood was born in England in 1907, but was taken as a child to Chile, where her father, an engineer, worked on the trans-Andean railway.  She remained in Chile until she was approximately 15 years old.  Her experiences were recounted in an unpublished novel, Childhood in Chile.

Career 
Her books were published by Thomas Nelson Ltd through the 1950s and 1960s.  She created a series of books based around the character Peter Tiggywig and friends.

Other work includes Master Mouse the Madcap (1958), and Animal Playtime and Animal Worktime which appeared in the Look with Mother series, and a paperback series for children published by Nelson including 'Aesop's Fables'(1965) 'Brer Rabbit' and the 'Water Babies' (abridged)

Miss Haywood was a keen student of science and an amateur naturalist and anthropologist.  Many of the books she illustrated for the publisher Hutchinson & Co., London, were keenly observed and scrupulously accurate depictions of plants, birds and animals.  When commissioned to do illustrations for a children's book on dinosaurs, her research into the skin colors she subsequently chose for her dinosaur illustrations was cited by the Royal Academy of Sciences.

Haywood was also an important practitioner of fore-edge painting, where a watercolor painting is applied to the fanned edge of an older book  and binding paintings.  She became acquainted with the art forms through an uncle who was associated with the Bayntun-Riviere Bindery of Bath. She did several fore-edge and double fore-edge paintings on commission every year from the 1930s to the 1940s for often for Inman's Books, an antiquarian book dealer in New York City. She probably stopped painting for-edge paintings in the late 1940s, putting the majority of her art work in her publishing of illustrated children's books.  
   
She died in Bournemouth, England in 1995.

Selected works

Illustrated by Helen Haywood

Written by Isobel St Vincent 
Wanda the Panda (1939) 
Woodland Verse (1940) 
Figgles Frog Sees Life (1940) 
Sandy's Seven Tails (1943) 
All A-Growing: the adventures of two young gardeners (1943) 
The Helen Haywood Colour Book (1944) 
British Butterflies and Moths (1952)

Written by Geoffrey Ford 
Hedgehog's Holiday (1938)

Written by others 
Ducks, geese, and swans, by Oscar J. Merne (1974) 
The Tortoise and the Ducks and other Aesop Fables (1963)

Written and illustrated by Helen Haywood 
The mouse that ran (1926) 
The Happy Tree (1951) 
Peter Tiggywig Grows Up (1955) 
Peter Tiggywig Goes Camping (1955) 
Peter Tiggywig Runs Away (1956) 
Peter Tiggywig's Wonderful Train (1957) 
Peter Tiggywig At School (1958) 
Peter Tiggywig At The Fair (1958) 
Peter Tiggywig's Toy-shop (1958) 
Peter Tiggywig At Sea (1959) 
Peter Tiggywig At The Picnic (1960, 1961) *Peter Tiggywig's Birthday Party (1961) 
The New Noah's Ark of Rare Animals (1964) 
The days of the dinosaurs (1964, 1965)

References 

English illustrators
1907 births
1995 deaths